Neolepetopsoidea is the name of a taxonomic superfamily which is now considered to be a synonym of Lottioidea. Previously Neolepetopsoidea was considered to be a family of sea snails, marine gastropod mollusks within the clade Patellogastropoda.

Families
Families within the superfamily Neolepetopsoidea according to the taxonomy of the Gastropoda by Bouchet & Rocroi, 2005) include:
Family Neolepetopsidae  McLean, 1990 - symmetrical limpets
 † Family Daminilidae  Horný, 1961
 † Family Lepetopsidae  McLean, 1990

(Families that are exclusively fossil are indicated with a dagger: †)

According to the World Register of Marine Species, Neolepetopsoidea was synonymized with Lottioidea, so all these three families were moved to the superfamily Lottioidea.

See also 
 Patellogastropoda#2007 taxonomy

References 

Patellogastropoda